Sheldon Leonard Bershad (February 22, 1907 – January 11, 1997) was an American film and television actor, producer, director, and screenwriter.

Early life 
Sheldon Leonard Bershad was born in Manhattan, New York City, the son of middle-class Jewish parents Anna Levit and Frank Bershad. He graduated from Syracuse University in 1929.

Career 

As an actor, Leonard specialized in playing supporting characters, especially gangsters or "heavies". His trademark was his especially thick New York accent, usually delivered from the side of his mouth. (He would often pronounce th as t and would say er as oi, thus he would pronounce earth as oit.) His breakthrough role was in Another Thin Man (1939), in which he played a soft-spoken but dangerous murder suspect. From then on he was typecast as smooth gangsters or streetwise guys in such films as It's a Wonderful Life (1946; as bartender Nick), To Have and Have Not (1944), Guys and Dolls (1955), and Open Secret (1948). He was a favorite of director Frank Capra, who asked him to play an executive mobster in his 1961 film Pocketful of Miracles. Leonard became so associated with tough-guy parts that he was occasionally cast against type, as a law-enforcement officer, in films like Street of Chance (1942) and Decoy (1946).

On radio from 1945 to 1955, Leonard played an eccentric racetrack tout on The Jack Benny Program and later in the TV series of the same name. His role was to salute Benny out of the blue in railroad stations, on street corners, or in department stores ("Hey, Bud. C'mere a minute."), ask Benny what he was about to do, and then proceed to try to argue him out of his course of action by resorting to inane and irrelevant racing logic. As "The Tout", he never gave out information on horse racing, unless Jack demanded it. One excuse the tout gave was, "Who knows about horses?"

Leonard was part of the cast of voice actors on the Damon Runyon Theatre radio show (1948–1949). He was part of the ensemble cast of the Martin and Lewis radio show. He also appeared frequently on Dragnet and The Adventures of the Saint, often playing gangsters and heavies, but also sometimes in more sympathetic roles. Leonard was also a regular on the radio comedy series The Adventures of Maisie in the 1940s. During the 1950s, Leonard provided the voice of lazy, fat cat Dodsworth in two Warner Bros. Merrie Melodies cartoons directed by Robert McKimson.

In the adventure movie The Iroquois Trail (1950), Leonard played against type in the significant role of Chief Ogane, a Native American warrior, who pursues and fights the frontiersman Nat "Hawkeye" Cutler (George Montgomery) in a climactic duel to the death with knives.

Later in the 1950s and 1960s, he established a reputation as a producer of many successful television series, often in partnership with Danny Thomas. They included The Danny Thomas Show (aka Make Room For Daddy) (1953–64), where midway through that series run, he had a recurring role as Danny's agent, Phil Brokaw; The Andy Griffith Show (1960–68); Gomer Pyle U.S.M.C. (1964–69); and I Spy (1965–68). Thanks to his many years in show business, Leonard had cultivated a quick, shrewd capacity for pinpointing strengths and flaws in prospective projects. It was Leonard who recognized that a sitcom pilot, Head of the Family, was structurally sound but miscast. He felt that actor–writer Carl Reiner was too overbearing as the lead, and insisted that the script be refilmed with up-and-coming comic Dick Van Dyke. The result was The Dick Van Dyke Show (1961–66).

Sheldon Leonard also directed several TV series episodes, including four of the first eight episodes of the TV series Lassie (1954). Leonard also provided the voice of Linus the Lionhearted in a series of Post Crispy Critters cereal TV commercials in 1963–64, which led to a Linus cartoon series that aired on Saturday (and later, Sunday) mornings on CBS (1964–66) and ABC (1967–69). He also was briefly the star of his own television show Big Eddie (1975), where he played the owner of a large sports arena. The show lasted for only ten episodes.

The character of Andy Taylor was introduced in a 1960 episode of The Danny Thomas Show, which led to the series The Andy Griffith Show. Leonard is informally credited with developing the practice of using an episode of a series as a backdoor pilot episode for new series, in which a guest star is introduced as a new character with the intention of using this character as the basis for a new show. Leonard introduced the Andy Griffith spin-off Mayberry R. F. D. as the summer replacement for the Griffith show, so it would have a pre-sold audience during the regular season.  He was the executive producer on Gomer Pyle U.S.M.C., and had an appearance on the show as a Hollywood producer who has to do 34 takes on a movie scene before Sergeant Carter gets it right ("A Star Is Not Born").

Leonard also has the distinction (along with author Mickey Spillane) of being one of the first two Miller Lite spokesmen. Using his trademark accent, he told the audience, "I was at first reluctant to try Miller Lite, but then I was persuaded to do so by my friend, Large Louis."  One of his last acting roles was a guest appearance on the TV series Cheers, in which he played Sid Nelson, the proprietor of "The Hungry Heifer", Norm Peterson's favorite eating establishment.

Leonard died on January 11, 1997, six weeks before his 90th birthday. He was buried at Hillside Memorial Park Cemetery in Culver City, California.

Legacy 
Bill Cosby, whom Leonard cast in I Spy, described Leonard as "my last father" when he dedicated an episode of Cosby to both Leonard and his slain son Ennis Cosby. Bill Cosby included an impersonation of Sheldon Leonard in one track of his 1966 hit comedy album Wonderfulness. The track "Niagara Falls" describes Sheldon Leonard's honeymoon at Niagara Falls.

In "Monkees Marooned", the eighth episode of the second season of The Monkees, a character named Leonard Sheldon, and speaking with Leonard's accent, approaches Peter Tork on the street, much like "The Tout" and persuades Tork to trade his guitar for a treasure map.

Leonard's name served as an eponym for the characters Sheldon Cooper and Leonard Hofstadter in the American sitcom The Big Bang Theory because the writers were fans of his work.

Selected filmography 
Actor

 The People's Enemy (1935) as Third Department of Justice Representative
 Ouanga (1936) as LeStrange, the Overseer
 Another Thin Man (1939) as Phil Church
 Tall, Dark and Handsome (1941) as Pretty Willie Williams
 Private Nurse (1941) as John Winton
 Buy Me That Town (1941) as Chink Moran
 Week-End in Havana (1941) as Boris
 Married Bachelor (1941) as Johnny Branigan
 Rise and Shine (1941) as Menace
 Born To Sing (1942) as Pete Detroit
 Tortilla Flat (1942) as Tito Ralph
 Pierre of the Plains (1942) as Clairou
 Street of Chance (1942) as Detective Joe Marruci
 Lucky Jordan (1942) as Slip Moran
 City Without Men (1943) as Monk LaRue
 Taxi, Mister (1943) as Gangster Louis Glorio / The Frisco Ghost
 Hit the Ice (1943) as 'Silky' Fellowsby
 Passport to Suez (1943) as Johnny Booth
 Harvest Melody (1943) as Chuck
 Klondike Kate (1943) as 'Sometime' Smith
 Timber Queen (1944) as Smacksie Golden
 Uncertain Glory (1944) as Henri Duval
 Trocadero (1944) as Mickey Jones
 Gambler's Choice (1944) as Chappie Wilson
 To Have and Have Not (1944) as Lt. Coyo
 The Falcon in Hollywood (1944) as Louie Buchanan
 Zombies on Broadway (1945) as Ace Miller
 Crime, Inc. (1945) as Capt. Ferrone
 Radio Stars on Parade (1945) as Lucky Maddox
 River Gang (1945) as Peg Leg
 Why Girls Leave Home (1945) as Chris Williams
 Captain Kidd (1945) as Cyprian Boyle
 Frontier Gal (1945) as 'Blackie' Shoulders
 The Gentleman Misbehaves (1946) as Trigger Stazzi
 Her Kind of Man (1946) as Felix Bender
 Rainbow Over Texas (1946) as Kirby Haynes
 Somewhere in the Night (1946) as Sam
 Bowery Bombshell (1946) as Ace Deuce Baker
 The Last Crooked Mile (1946) as Ed 'Wires' MacGuire
 Decoy (1946) as Police Sgt. Joe Portugal
 It's a Wonderful Life (1946) as Nick, the bartender
 Sinbad the Sailor (1947) as Auctioneer
 Violence (1947) as Fred Stalk
 The Hal Roach Comedy Carnival  (1947) as Louie, in 'Fabulous Joe'
 The Fabulous Joe (1947) as Louie
 The Gangster (1947) as Cornell
 Open Secret (1948) as Detective Sgt. Mike Frontelli
 Alias a Gentleman (1948) as Harry Bealer
 If You Knew Susie (1948) as Steve Garland
 Madonna of the Desert (1948) as Nick Julian
 Jinx Money (1948) as Lippy Harris
 Joe Palooka in Winner Take All (1948) as Hermon
 Shep Comes Home (1948) as 'Swifty' Lewis
 Two Knights from Brooklyn (1949) as Louis Glorio / The Frisco Ghost (archive footage)
 Daughter of the Jungle (1949) as Dalton Kraik
 My Dream Is Yours (1949) as Fred Grimes
 Take One False Step (1949) as Pacciano
 The Iroquois Trail (1950) as Chief Ogane
 Abbott and Costello Meet the Invisible Man (1951) as Morgan
 Behave Yourself! (1951) as Shortwave Bert
 Come Fill the Cup (1951) as Lennie Garr
 Here Come the Nelsons (1952) as Duke
 Kiddin' the Kitten (1952) as Dodsworth (voice)
 Young Man with Ideas (1952) as Rodwell 'Brick' Davis
 Sock-a-Doodle-Do (1952) as Kid Banty (voice)
 Breakdown (1952) as Nick Sampson
 Stop, You're Killing Me (1952) as Lefty
 A Peck o' Trouble (1953) as Dodsworth (voice)
 The Diamond Queen (1953) as Mogul
 Money From Home (1953) as Jumbo Schneider
 Guys and Dolls (1955) as Harry the Horse
 Pocketful of Miracles (1961) as Steve Darcey
 The Brink's Job (1978) as J. Edgar Hoover

Producer
 The Danny Thomas Show  (1953–1964). He also appeared onscreen as Phil Brokaw (1957–1961).
 The Andy Griffith Show (1960–1968).
 The Dick Van Dyke Show (1961–1966). He also appeared onscreen in the season 3 episode "Big Max Calvada".
 Gomer Pyle, U.S.M.C. (1964–1969). He also appeared onscreen in the season 5 episode "A Star is Not Born".
 I Spy (1965–1968).
 Accidental Family (1967–1968)
 My World and Welcome to It (1969–1970)
 From a Bird's Eye View (1970–1971)
 Shirley's World (1971–1972)

Director
 It's Always Jan
 The Andy Griffith Show
 The Danny Thomas Show
 The Dick Van Dyke Show
 My Favorite Martian (pilot only)
 I Spy
 Lassie (4 episodes, Season 1: 1954)

References

Further reading 
 Leonard, Sheldon. And The Show Goes On: Broadway and Hollywood Adventures. Limelight, 1995,

External links 

Sheldon Leonard at Turner Classic Movies

Sheldon Leonard at museum.tv
 

1907 births
1997 deaths
20th-century American businesspeople
20th-century American male actors
American male film actors
American male radio actors
American male television actors
American male voice actors
American television directors
Burials at Hillside Memorial Park Cemetery
Film directors from New York City
Jewish American male actors
Jewish American writers
Male actors from New York City
People from Manhattan
Primetime Emmy Award winners
Stuyvesant High School alumni
Syracuse University alumni
Television producers from New York City
Warner Bros. Cartoons voice actors
20th-century American Jews